WV1 or WV-1 may refer to:
 Lockheed WV-1 Warning Star, a surveillance aircraft
 West Virginia's 1st congressional district
 U.S. Route 50 in West Virginia, formerly West Virginia Route 1
 WorldView-1, a commercial Earth observation satellite
 WV1, a postcode district in Wolverhampton, England; see WV postcode area